Missing Links is a compilation album of rare and previously unreleased songs by the Monkees, issued by Rhino Records in 1987. It is the first volume of a three-volume set, followed by Missing Links Volume Two in 1990 and Missing Links Volume Three in 1996.

While "Apples, Peaches, Bananas and Pears" and "If You Have the Time" had both been featured in the reruns of their 1960s television series, none of the tracks had ever been issued commercially. "All of Your Toys", written by Bill Martin, was the first Monkees recording to feature all four members performing on the track, and was initially intended to become their third single. A publishing issue prevented the song from being released, with Neil Diamond's "A Little Bit Me, A Little Bit You" chosen instead.

Michael Nesmith later re-recorded "Nine Times Blue" for his Magnetic South album and "Carlisle Wheeling" (as "Conversations") for his Loose Salute album.

The bulk of the material on this album comes from The Birds, The Bees and The Monkees sessions, which were self-produced.

The original 1987 vinyl and cassette releases in the U.S. did not contain tracks 7, 8, 15 and 16. The compact disc was released in the U.S. and U.K. in December 1988. A vinyl version was released in 2021 from Friday Music for Record Store Day, with no tracks omitted.

Track listing

Session information

"Apples, Peaches, Bananas and Pears"
Written by Tommy Boyce and Bobby Hart
Lead vocal by Micky Dolenz
Backing vocals: Tommy Boyce, Bobby Hart, Ron Hicklin
Guitar: Wayne Erwin, Gerry McGee, Louie Shelton
Bass: Larry Taylor
Drums: Billy Lewis
Percussion: Gene Estes
Produced by Tommy Boyce and Bobby Hart
Recorded at RCA Victor Studios, Hollywood, October 28 and 30, 1966, during sessions for More of the Monkees

"If You Have the Time"
Written by Bill Chadwick and David Jones
Lead vocal by Davy Jones
Backing vocals: Davy Jones, Bill Chadwick and Unknown
Guitar: Unknown
Electric Guitar: Louie Shelton
Bass: Joe Osborn
Drums: John Guerin
Piano: Michel Rubini
Moog Synthesizer: Paul Beaver
Produced by Bill Chadwick and Davy Jones
Recorded at RCA Victor Studios, Hollywood, August 6, November 11 (2:00 P.M. - 5:00 P.M.), 1969, during sessions for The Monkees Present

"I Don't Think You Know Me" (First Recorded Version)
Written by Gerry Goffin and Carole King
Arranged by Don Peake
Lead vocal by Michael Nesmith
Harmony vocals: Micky Dolenz
Backing vocals: Micky Dolenz and Unknown
Guitar: James Burton, Glen Campbell, Al Casey
Organ: Larry Knechtel
Bass: Bob West
Drums: Hal Blaine 
Percussion: Gary Coleman, Jim Gordon
Produced by Michael Nesmith
Recorded at RCA Victor Studios, Hollywood, June 25 (7:30 pm– 12:15 am), July 16, August 30 (8:00 - 12:00 A.M.), 1966, during sessions for The Monkees
Two mixes were made of this song. The first featured Micky on vocals and was mixed by Tommy Boyce and Bobby Hart. Michael Nesmith recorded his own vocals later that year.

"Party"
Written by David Jones and Steve Pitts
Lead vocal by Davy Jones
Guitar: Al Casey, Mike Deasey, Howard Roberts
Bass: Lyle Ritz
Drums: Hal Blaine
Organ: Don Randi
Marimba/Percussion/Tambourine: Gary Coleman, Gene Estes
Trombone: Milt Bernhart, Richard Leith, Lew McCreary, Frank Rosolino
Trumpet: Buddy Childers, Clyde Reasinger, Jack Sheldon, Anthony Terran
Saxophone/Woodwind: John Lowe
Violin: Nathan Kaproff, George Kast, Marvin Limonick, Alex Murray, Erno Neufeld, Ambrose Russo
Produced by Davy Jones and Shorty Rogers
Recorded at RCA Victor Studios, Hollywood, February 15 (7:30 - 10:30 P.M.) and 17 (10:00 P.M. - 2:00 A.M.), 1968, during sessions for The Birds, The Bees & The Monkees
Musically similar to another Jones/Pitts song, "I'm Gonna Try", which was recorded the same day

"Carlisle Wheeling" (First Recorded Version)
Written by Michael Nesmith
Lead vocal by Michael Nesmith
Acoustic Guitar: Michael Nesmith
Banjo: Peter Tork
Drums: Eddie Hoh
Organ: Michael Nesmith
Percussion: Michael Nesmith (and Eddie Hoh?)
Produced by Michael Nesmith
Recorded at RCA Victor Studios, Hollywood, November 4 (10:00 A.M. - 1:30 P.M.), 1967, during sessions for The Birds, The Bees & The Monkees
A second version was later released as a bonus track on the 1995 Rhino remaster of Instant Replay.
This first version would later be included on the Rhino Music Box box set in 2001

"(My) Storybook of You" 
Written by Tommy Boyce and Bobby Hart
Lead vocal by Davy Jones
Backing vocals: Davy Jones, Tommy Boyce, Bobby Hart
Electric Guitar: Unknown
Acoustic Guitar: Louie Shelton
Bass: Joe Osborn
Drums: Hal Blaine, Billy Lewis
Piano: John Gallie
Tack Piano: Larry Knechtel
Violin: Bill Kursach, Jerome Reisler, Ralph Schaeffer, Sidney Sharp, Shari Zippert
Cello: Jesse Ehrlich
Saxophone: Jay Migliori
Trumpet: Jules Chaikin, Oliver Mitchell
Trombone: Dick Nash
Unknown: William Pening
Produced by Tommy Boyce and Bobby Hart
Recorded at The Sound Factory, Hollywood, May 30 (2:00 P.M. - 5:00 P.M., 6:00 P.M. - 9:00 P.M.) and 31 (4:00 P.M. - 7:00 P.M.), 1969, during sessions for The Monkees Present
This song is mislabeled, as the correct title is "My Storybook Of You", as per the 2016 Rhino Super Deluxe box set of The Monkees Present

"Rosemarie" 
Written by Micky Dolenz
Lead vocal by Micky Dolenz
Electric Guitar: Keith Allison
Acoustic Guitar: Micky Dolenz, Peter Tork
Bass: Chip Douglas?
Drums: Jim Gordon?
Tambourine: Larry Bunker
Piano: Michel Rubini
Saxophone: Bill Hood
Trumpet: Buddy Childers, Carroll Lewis, Oliver Mitchell, Stu Williamson
Trombone: Lou Blackburn, Herbie Harper, Lew McCreary
Produced by Micky Dolenz & Shorty Rogers
Recorded at RCA Victor Studios, February 19?, March 1 (8:00 P.M. - 11:00 P.M.), 14 (9:00 A.M. - 1:30 P.M.) and at Western Recorders, Hollywood, June 7 (5:00 - 7:30, 10:00 P.M. - 2:30 A.M.), 1968, during sessions for The Birds, The Bees & The Monkees and Head, respectively
A second version was later released as a bonus track on the 1995 Rhino remaster of Instant Replay

"My Share of the Sidewalk" 
Written by Michael Nesmith
Lead vocal by Davy Jones
Guitar: Michael Nesmith
Bass: Rick Dey
Drums: Eddie Hoh
Piano: Michael Nesmith
Cello: Justin DiTullio, Ray Kramer, Emmet Sargeant, Eleanor Slatkin
Trumpet: Pete Candoli, Buddy Childers, Anthony Terran
Trombone: Dick Leith, Lew McCreary
Produced by Michael Nesmith
Recorded at RCA Victor Studios, Hollywood, CA, January 9 (1:00 P.M. - 4:00 P.M., 5:00 P.M. - 8:00 P.M.) and 19 (1:00 P.M. - 4:00 P.M.), 1968, during sessions for The Birds, The Bees & The Monkees
An early run-through of the song, with Mike on lead vocals, was later released on the 2010 Rhino Deluxe Edition of The Birds, The Bees & The Monkees
This is a rare excursion for The Monkees into a variable time signature. It is mostly 5/4, but changes. 
The recording date on the CD label is incorrect.  The date (January 1969) refers to Nesmith's re-recording of the song during the sessions for Instant Replay.  This re-recording was released on the Super Deluxe box set of Instant Replay in 2011.
Colgems labelmates P.K. Limited recorded a version of this song in 1969.

"All of Your Toys"
Written by Bill Martin
Lead vocal by Micky Dolenz
Backing vocals: Micky Dolenz, Davy Jones, Michael Nesmith, Peter Tork
Electric 12-String Guitar: Michael Nesmith
Bass: John London
Drums: Micky Dolenz
Tambourine: Davy Jones
Harpsichord: Peter Tork
Produced by Chip Douglas
Recorded at RCA Victor Studios, Hollywood, January 16 (10:00 A.M. - 6:00 P.M.), 23 (10:00 A.M. - 1:00 P.M., 2:00 P.M. - 7:00 P.M., 8:30 P.M. - 12:00 A.M.), 24 (1:00 P.M. - 9:00 P.M.), 28 (2:00 - 5:00 P.M.), 30 (10:00 A.M. - 1:00 P.M., 2:00 P.M. - 4:00 P.M., 5:00 P.M. - 7:00 P.M.) and 31 (2:00 P.M. - 6:00 P.M., 7:00 P.M. - 12:00 A.M.), 1967, during sessions for Headquarters
The song was intended to be a single A-side, but was not controlled by the Monkees' publishing company, Screen Gems, with the publisher, Tickson Music, refusing to sell copyright
Included as a bonus track on the 1995 and 2006 Rhino remasters of Headquarters in a slightly different mono mix, as well as the Listen to the Band and Music Box sets in a slightly different stereo mix. Also available on Monkeemania (The Very Best of the Monkees) in the same stereo mix found here.

"Nine Times Blue"
Written by Michael Nesmith
Lead vocal by Michael Nesmith
Guitar: Michael Nesmith
Pedal Steel Guitar: Orville "Red" Rhodes
Bass: Chip Douglas
Produced by Michael Nesmith
Recorded at RCA Victor Studios, Hollywood, April 5 (10:00 P.M. - 1:30 A.M.), 1968, during sessions for The Birds, The Bees & The Monkees
A demo version was recorded during the Headquarters sessions and later released as a bonus track on the 1995 and 2006 Rhino remasters of Headquarters, as well as the 2000 Rhino Handmade set The Headquarters Sessions

"So Goes Love" (Second Recorded Version)
Written by Gerry Goffin and Carole King
Arranged by Don Peake
Lead vocal by Davy Jones
Backing vocals: Davy Jones
Guitar: Peter Tork, James Burton, Glen Campbell, Al Casey, Jim Helms
Bass: Bill Pittman
Drums: Hal Blaine
Electric Piano: Billy Preston
Percussion: Gary Coleman, Jim Gordon
Produced by Michael Nesmith
Recorded at Western Recorders between July 7 (8:00 - 11:30 P.M.) and 16, 1966, during sessions for The Monkees 

"Kicking Stones" (AKA Teeny Tiny Gnome)
Written by Lynn Castle and Wayne Erwin
Lead vocal by Micky Dolenz
Backing vocals: Tommy Boyce, Wayne Erwin, Bobby Hart, Ron Hicklin
Guitar: Wayne Erwin, Gerry McGee, Louie Shelton
Bass: Larry Taylor
Drums: Billy Lewis
Piano: Bobby Hart
Organ: Paul Suter
Trumpet: Steve Huffsteter
Trombone: Gilbert Falco, Dick Hyde
Horn: Bob Jung, Don McGinnis
Flute: Paul Suter
Vibes: Emil Richards
Produced by Tommy Boyce and Bobby Hart
Recorded at RCA Victor Studio B, Hollywood, August 23 (10:30 P.M. - 2:00 A.M.) and 27 (3:30 P.M. start), 1966, during sessions for More of the Monkees
This song is mislabeled, as the correct title is "Kicking Stones", as per the 2006 Rhino remaster of More of the Monkees

"Of You"
Written by Bill and John Chadwick
Lead vocal by Michael Nesmith
Harmony vocal: Micky Dolenz
Guitar: Peter Tork, James Burton, Glen Campbell, Al Casey, Mike Deasey
Bass: Bob West
Drums: Hal Blaine
Percussion: Gary Coleman, Jim Gordon
Piano: Michael Cohen, Larry Knechtel
Produced by Michael Nesmith
Recorded at Western Recorders, Hollywood, July 25 (8:00 P.M. - 12:15 A.M.) and 27, 1966, during sessions for The Monkees

"War Games"
Written by David Jones and Steve Pitts
Lead vocal by Davy Jones
Guitar: Mike Deasey, Al Hendrickson, Gerry McGee
Bass: Max Bennett
Drums: Earl Palmer, and Unknown
Tambourine: Unknown
Harpsichord: Don Randi
Violin: Sam Freed, Nathan Kaproff, George Kast, Marvin Limonick, Alex Murray, Erno Neufeld
Cello: Marie Fera, Edgar Lustgarten, Jacqueline Lustgarten, Frederick Seykora
Trumpet: Buddy Childers, Jack Sheldon
French Horn: John Cave, David Duke, Arthur Maebe
Trombone: George Roberts
Produced by Davy Jones, Lester Sill and Shorty Rogers
Recorded at RCA Victor Studios, Hollywood, February 6 (2:00 - 5:00, 10:00 P.M. - 2:00 A.M.) and 8 (7:30 P.M. - 10:30 P.M.), 1968, during sessions for The Birds, The Bees & The Monkees

"Lady's Baby"
Written by Peter Tork
Lead vocal by Peter Tork
Backing vocal: Karen Harvey Hammer
Guitar: Peter Tork (and Lance Wakely?)
Electric Guitar: Stephen Stills
Bass: Lance Wakely
Drums: Dewey Martin
Produced by Peter Tork
Recorded at Sunset Sound Recorders, Hollywood, January 24 (5:00 P.M. - 8:00 P.M., 9:00 P.M. - 12:00 A.M., 1:00 A.M. - 2:00 A.M.), 25 (4:30 P.M. - 7:30 P.M.), and March 13-17, 1968 and Western Recorders, Hollywood, February 2 and 7 (3:00 P.M. - 6:00 P.M.), 1968, during sessions for The Birds, The Bees & The Monkees. It was originally intended for the album, but constant production changes and re-recordings by Tork caused the song to not be finished in time for release.

"Time and Time Again"
Written by Bill Chadwick and David Jones
Lead vocal by Davy Jones
Backing vocals: Davy Jones, Bill Chadwick
Electric Guitar: Louie Shelton, and Unknown
Bass: Joe Osborn
Drums: John Guerin
Moog Synthesizer: Paul Beaver
Calliope: Michel Rubini
Produced by Bill Chadwick and Davy Jones
Recorded at RCA Victor Studios, Hollywood, August 6, November 11, 1969, during sessions for The Monkees Present
The version presented here has studio chatter at the beginning and end of the song. When it was released as a bonus track on the 1994 Rhino remaster of Changes, the dialogue was removed, and the song fades out at the end, whereas the version presented here does not. The Moog does not appear in the 1994 version until the instrumental bridge, whereas the Moog can be heard throughout the version presented here.

References

The Monkees compilation albums
1987 compilation albums
Rhino Records compilation albums